Mametz is a commune in the Pas-de-Calais department in the Hauts-de-France region of France.

Geography
Mametz is locates about 10 miles (16 km) south of Saint-Omer, at the junction of the D157 and D197 roads. The commune was joined by the villages of Crecques and Marthes in 1822.

Population

Places of interest
 The church of St.Vaast, dating from the seventeenth century.
 The church of St. Honore at Crecques, dating from the nineteenth century.
 The church of St.Quentin at Marthes, dating from the nineteenth century.
 An old watermill, now restored.

See also
Communes of the Pas-de-Calais department

References

External links

 Town website

Communes of Pas-de-Calais